The Maridjabin or Marrisjabin, were an indigenous Australian people of the Northern Territory.

Language
Marridjabin is a dialect of Marrithiyel, one of the Western Daly languages.

Country
The Maridjabin's territory occupied some  predominantly of swampland at mouth of the Moyle River and along the coast near Cape Dombey, and the hinterland for about 20 miles east of that coast,

Alternative names
 Murindjabin. (exonym applied to them by the Murrinh-Patha)
 Murintjabin.
 Murintjaran.

Notes

Citations

Sources

Aboriginal peoples of the Northern Territory